The FIL European Luge Natural Track Championships 2008 was held 15–17 February in Olang, Italy. The Italians won the most medals in this event with five despite not winning any of the three events.

Men's singles
February 17, 2008. This event was contested over three runs. Pigneter earned his second medal in this year's championships, following his silver medal in the doubles event the previous day.

Women's singles
February 16–17, 2008. This event was contested over three runs.

Men's doubles
February 16, 2008. This was contested over two runs. It was Porzhnev and Lazarev's third straight championships in this event.

Medal table

References
 European Championships Olang, February 14th-17th, 2008. at the Fédération Internationale de Luge de Course (16 February 2008 article accessed 16 February 2008.)
 European championships in Olang, ITA. at the Fédération Internationale de Luge de Course (17 February 2008 article accessed 17 February 2008.)
 Men's doubles natural track European champions
 Men's singles natural track European champions
 Women's singles natural track European champions

FIL European Luge Natural Track Championships
2008 in luge
Luge in Italy
2008 in Italian sport
2008 in European sport
International sports competitions hosted by Italy